The Newton disc, also known as the disappearing colour disc, is a well-known physics experiment with a rotating disc with segments in different colours (usually Newton's primary colours: red, orange, yellow, green, blue, indigo, and violet or ROYGBIV) appearing as white (or off-white or grey) when it spun rapidy about its axis.

This type of mix of light stimuli is called temporal optical mixing, a version of additive-averaging mixing. The concept that human visual perception cannot distinguish details of high-speed movements is popularly known as persistence of vision.

The disc is named after Isaac Newton. Although he published a circular diagram with segments for the primary colours that he had discovered, it is uncertain whether he actually ever used a spinning disc to demonstrate the principles of light.

Transparent variations for magic lantern projection have been produced.

History
Around 165 CE, Ptolemy described in his book Optics a rotating potter's wheel with different colours on it. He noted how the different colours of sectors mixed together into one colour and how dots appeared as circles when the wheel was spinning very fast. When lines are drawn across the axis of the disc they make the whole surface appear to be of a uniform colour. "The visual impression that is created in the first revolution is invariably followed by repeated instances that subsequently produce an identical impression. This also happens in the case of shooting stars, whose light seems distended on account of their speed of motion, all according to the amount of perceptible distance it passes along with the sensible impression that arises in the visual faculty."

Porphyry ( – ) wrote in his commentary on Ptolemy's Harmonics how the senses are not stable but confused and inaccurate. Certain intervals between repeated impressions are not detected. A white or black spot on a spinning cone (or top) appears as a circle of that colour and a line on the top makes the whole surface appear in that colour. "Because of the swiftness of the movement we receive the impression of the line on every part of the cone as the line moves."

In the 11th century Ibn al-Haytham, who was familiar with Ptolemy's writings, described how coloured lines on a spinning top could not be discerned as different colours but appeared as one new colour composed of all of the colours of the lines. He deducted that sight needs some time to discern a colour. al-Haytam also noted that the top appeared motionless when spun extremely quick "for none of its points remains fixed in the same spot for any perceptible time".

After Ibn al-Haytham, Fakhr al-Din al-Razi (d. 1209) performed the spinning disk experiment, and like his predecessors he concluded that it shows an optical illusion. However, the astronomer-mathematician Nasir al-Din al-Tusi described al-Razi's text and arrived at a very different conclusion. Tusi introduced a common sense organ that forwards colour impressions to the soul. When colours change too fast, this organ can only pass on the mixed colour. One of Tusi's students was Qutb al-Din al-Shirazi (d.1311), and together with his  student Kamal al-Din al-Farisi he tried to explain the colours perceived in the experiment.

Newton's primary colours
On 16 February 1672 (6 February 1671 old style), Newton sent a paper to the Royal Society's journal Philosophical Transactions, about the experiments he had been conducting since 1666 with the refraction of light through glass prisms. He concluded that the different refracted rays of light – well parted from others – could not be changed by further refraction, nor by reflection or other means, except through mixture with other rays. He thus found the seven primary colours red, orange, yellow, green, blue, "a violet-purple" and indigo. When mixing the coloured rays from a prism, he found that "the most surprising and wonderful composition was that of whiteness" requiring all the primary colours "mixed in a due proportion".

In reaction to Robert Hooke's criticism of the new theory of light, Newton published a letter in the Philosophical Transactions, with other experiments that proved how sunlight existed of rays with different colours. He described how the cogs or teeth of a gyrating wheel behind a prism can block part of the light so that all the colours would be projected successively if the wheel turns rather slow, but how all the colours will be mixed into white light if the wheel turn very fast. He also pointed out that rays of light that were reflected from multi-coloured bodies were weakened by the loss of many rays and that a mixture of those rays would not produce a pure white, but a grey or "dirty" colour. This could be seen in dust, which on close inspection would reveal that it consists of many coloured particles, or when mixing several colours of paint. He also referred to a child's top which would display a "dirty" colour if it was painted in several colours and made to spin fast by whipping it.

After presenting his conclusions about dividing sunlight into primary colours and mixing them back together into white light, Newton presented a colour circle to illustrate the relations between these colours in his book Opticks (1704).

Many modern sources state that Isaac Newton himself used a spinning disc with coloured sectors to demonstrate how white light was actually the compound of the primary colours. However, these do not reference any historical source.

According to Joseph Plateau, the first to describe how a spinning disc with Newton's seven primary colours would show an (imperfect) white colour was Pieter van Musschenbroek in 1762.

See also
 Benham's top

References

External links

Isaac Newton
Color